CNS or Crystallography and NMR system, is a software library for computational structural biology. It is an offshoot of X-PLOR and uses much of the same syntax. It is used in the fields of X-ray crystallography and NMR spectroscopy of biological macromolecules.

References

External links
The program's webpage and reference manual

Science software
Computer libraries